Sisanda Henna (born 18 March 1982) is a producer, director, and actor.

His acting career exploded on South African screens in 2003, with the TV series Tsha Tsha. He won the Duku Duku Best Actor award in 2004, and had started working in production since 2003. As a runner, PA, co-ordinator, AD and then producer, he worked on many projects, including working as a trainee producer under Genevieve Hofmeyr on Clint Eastwood's Invictus.

Henna moved to Los Angeles to pursue work in Hollywood in 2007. He worked at the Pan African Film & Arts Festival, assisting the festival director with a variety of things. He launched his professional directing career, directing a commercial for the Department of Roads, South Africa in 2010. He trained as a story and script editor at Masters level through the South African National Film Video Foundation (NFVF). He completed the International Financing program offered by the NFVF.

He then went on to star as Sisansa Nkosi in the MNet series Inconceivable in 2020 where his character was married to Busi, played by  Refilwe Madumo. 

Henna is also a speaker, who is invited to speak at many events and gatherings, because of his celebrity status in South Africa.

Awards and nominations
 Henna won the Duku Duku award for being the best actor in this famous drama series.

Filmography
 Tsha Tsha as Andile (2003–2005)
 This Life as Jabu (2004)
 Einmal so wie ich will as Tobi (2005)
 Far Cry 2 (Video Game) voice over for Sisandra Henna (2008) 
 Invictus as a staff assistant (2009)
 Gauteng Maboneng as a Series Producer (2011)
 Klein Karoo as Bongi (2013)
 Donkerland as Mtonga (2013)
 Intersexions as a Director (2013)
 Gold Diggers as a Director (2015)
 Greed & Desire as a Director (2016)
 Hustle as Moruti Samson (2016)
 Emjindini (2018)
 Rogue (2020)
  Trackers (TV Series)  as Nkunzi Shabangu (2020)

References

1982 births
South African film directors
Living people
South African male actors